WGTK may refer to:

 WGTK (AM), a radio station (970 AM) licensed to serve Louisville, Kentucky, United States
 WGTK-FM, a radio station (94.5 FM) licensed to serve Greenville, South Carolina, United States